Léon Rosenfeld (14 August 1904 in Charleroi – 23 March 1974) was a Belgian physicist and Marxist.

Rosenfeld was born into a secular Jewish family. He was a polyglot who knew eight or nine languages and was fluent in at least five of them.

Rosenfeld obtained a PhD at the University of Liège in 1926, and he was a close collaborator of the physicist Niels Bohr. He did early work in quantum electrodynamics that predates by two decades the work by Paul Dirac and Peter Bergmann. Rosenfeld contributed to a wide range of physics fields, from statistical physics and quantum field theory to astrophysics. Along with Frederik Belinfante, he derived the Belinfante–Rosenfeld stress–energy tensor. He also founded the journal Nuclear Physics and coined the term lepton.

In 1933, Rosenfeld married Yvonne Cambresier, who was one of the first women to obtain a Physics PhD from a European university. They had a daughter, Andrée Rosenfeld (1934–2008) and a son, Jean Rosenfeld.

Awards and honors
Rosenfeld held chairs at multiple universities: Liège, Utrecht, Manchester, and Copenhagen.

In 1949 Léon Rosenfeld was awarded the Francqui Prize for Exact Sciences.

References

External links
 
 Oral history interview transcript for Léon Rosenfeld on 3 September 1968, American Institute of Physics, Niels Bohr Library & Archives

1904 births
1974 deaths
Belgian Jews
Scientists from Charleroi
Belgian physicists
Jewish physicists
University of Liège alumni
Members of the German Academy of Sciences at Berlin